Thugcore 4 Life is the fourth studio album by American hip hop and hardcore punk artist, Danny Diablo. It was released August 14, 2007 via Suburban Noize Records. The album was praised by both hardcore punk fans as well as hip hop fans. This release was also the only Suburban Noize album to be distributed by Epitaph Records.

Track listing

Personnel

 Dan Singer - primary artist, executive producer, lead vocals, writer
 Big Left - guest vocals on track 8
 Brad Xavier - executive producer, writer, guest vocals on track 4
 Casey Quintal - art direction, design
 CeeKay Jones - guest vocals on track 6
 Chris Love - photography
 Daniel O’Connor - guest vocals on track 8
 Dante Ross - producer
 Dave Carlock - engineer
 Dean Baltulonis - engineer
 George Carroll - writer, guest vocals on track 8
 Havok of the Subhoodz - guest vocals on track 4
 Jamey Jasta - executive producer
 John Edney - engineer, mixing
 John Morrical - producer
 Panic of the ShotBlockers - guest vocals on track 6
 Patrick Shevelin - engineer, mastering
 Prince Metropolitan - guest vocals on tracks 6 and 10
 Rob Aston - writer, guest vocals on tracks 8 and 10
 Ron Braunstein - writer, guest vocals on track 10
 Stress of the Subhoodz - guest vocals on track 4
 Tim Armstrong - engineer, executive producer, writer

References

2007 albums
Danny Diablo albums
Hellcat Records albums
Suburban Noize Records albums